Valley of Badmen is a 1931 American Western film directed by Jack Irwin and starring Buddy Roosevelt, Barbara Worth and Tom London.

Cast
 Buddy Roosevelt as Jim Simpson 
 Tom London as Horton 
 Barbara Worth as Barbara Anderson 
 Slim Whitaker

Plot
Simpson inherits a ranch, but before he can take possession he learns that the property has been sold to pay past-due taxes. He investigates the situation and finds that a county official is a criminal.

References

Bibliography
 Michael R. Pitts. Poverty Row Studios, 1929–1940: An Illustrated History of 55 Independent Film Companies, with a Filmography for Each. McFarland & Company, 2005.

External links
 

1931 films
1931 Western (genre) films
American Western (genre) films
Films directed by Jack Irwin
1930s English-language films
1930s American films